This is a list of businesses in Omaha, comprising companies that are presently headquartered in Omaha, Nebraska. This list also includes companies previously headquartered in Omaha.

Overview
Although Nebraska's economy is still primarily based on agriculture, Omaha's economy today has diversified to become a national leader in several industries, including banking, insurance, telecommunications, architecture/construction and transportation. Omaha's economy has grown dramatically since the early 1990s.  The city has five companies that rank in the Fortune 500.  It also is the smallest city to have two major research hospitals, the University of Nebraska Medical Center and Creighton University Medical Center.

Omaha's most prominent businessman is Warren Buffett, nicknamed the "Oracle of Omaha", who was ranked by Forbes magazine as the fourth richest man in the world (in 2013).  He lives in a relatively modest home in the Dundee neighborhood west of downtown Omaha.

Businesses

A
 American Gramaphone – record label for Chip Davis' Mannheim Steamroller group

B

 Baker's Supermarkets
 Berkshire Hathaway – large Fortune 500 holding company controlled by investor Warren Buffett
 Blue Cross Blue Shield of Nebraska
 Borsheim's Fine Jewelry – the largest independent jewelry store in the country, owned by Berkshire Hathaway
 Bozell Worldwide – once one of the largest advertising agencies in the world

C
 Central States Indemnity Company – wholly owned company of Berkshire Hathaway
 CHI Health

D 

 DLR Group - Architectural firm

F
 Film Streams – nonprofit arts organization that specializes in offering screenings and education on film
 First National of Nebraska

G
 G. D. Searle & Company
 Godfather's Pizza – pizza franchise chain 
 Gordmans

H
 Hayneedle – operator of e-commerce websites
 HDR, Inc. – formerly Henningson, Durham and Richardson, large healthcare architecture

I
 Infofree
 Intrado Corporation formerly West Corporation – Fortune 1000 company

L
 Lauritzen Corporation – parent company of the First National of Nebraska companies
 Lawson Kroeker Investment Management Investment management firm
 Lindsay Corporation – manufacturer of irrigation systems
 Leo A Daly - Engineering firm

M
 Nebraska Methodist Health System
 Midland Scientific – national, women-owned laboratory products distributor
 Mutual of Omaha – Fortune 500 insurance company, one of the country's largest, known for its "Wild Kingdom" television series

N
 National Indemnity Company 
 Nebraska Furniture Mart – country's largest home furnishings store, owned by Berkshire Hathaway
 Nebraska Medical Center
 No Frills Supermarkets
 NP Dodge Company

O

 Omaha Lancers – junior ice hockey team
 Omaha Public Power District
 Omaha Steaks
 Omaha World-Herald – primary daily newspaper of Nebraska
 Oriental Trading Company

P
 Peter Kiewit and Sons, Inc. – Fortune 500 company, it is one of the largest construction firms in the world; employee-owned
 Physicians Mutual Insurance Company – life and health insurance company, founded in 1902

R
The Reader – newspaper
 Right at Home

S
 Sojern

U

 Union Pacific Railroad – Fortune 500 company, railroad
 Union Stock Yards Company of Omaha

V
 Valmont Industries – Fortune 1000 company, manufacturer of light poles, street signs and other municipal hardware

W
 Werner Enterprises – one of the largest long-haul, over-the-road trucking companies
 Willow Springs Distilling Company
 Woodmen of the World

Y
 Yahoo! – datacenter (La Vista, Nebraska) and finance office (Omaha)

Unsorted

 Backwaters Press 
 Bailey Lauerman 
 Conagra Brands 
 Data Transmission Network 
 Dehner Company 
 Dial Global Local 
 Election Systems & Software 
 FamilyNet 
 Gorat's 
 Green Plains Inc. 
 InterNorth 
 J.P. Cooke Company 
 Kiewit Building Group Inc. 
 Kiewit Construction Company 
 Kiewit Engineering Co. 
 Kiewit Mining Group Inc. 
 Kiewit Western Co. 
 Kutak Rock 
 Leo A Daly 
 Lindsay Manufacturing 
 MultiMechanics 
 National Property Inspections 
 RFD-TV 
 Rocheford & Gould 
 Rural TV 
 Saddle Creek Records 
 SPEED! Nebraska Records 
 Standard Bridge Company 
 Western Bridge and Construction Company 
 WoodmenLife 
 Yesmail

Companies formerly based in Omaha
 Bekins Van Lines, Inc. – once the largest moving company in the country, no longer based in Omaha
 ConAgra Foods – Fortune 500 company, it is one of the country's largest packaged foods makers; no longer headquartered in Omaha
 Enron – former Fortune 500 company, declared bankruptcy amid corruption scandal. Former by merger between InterNorth and Houston Natural Gas
 First Data – Fortune 500 company specializing in global payment technology solutions that moved its headquarters to Hackensack, NJ in 1992
 Pacific Life Insurance Company – financial services company that domiciled in Omaha from Newport Beach, California in 2010
 Omaha Market House

See also

 Downtown Omaha
 List of historic companies in Omaha
 List of lists about Omaha, Nebraska

References

 
Businesses